Raymond Francis Starr (April 23, 1906 – February 9, 1963) was a professional baseball player who played pitcher in the Major Leagues from 1932 to 1945. Starr was named to the All-Star team in 1942. He would play for the New York Giants, St. Louis Cardinals, Boston Braves, Cincinnati Reds, Pittsburgh Pirates, and Chicago Cubs.

Although born in Nowata, Oklahoma, Starr lived most of his life in Centralia, Illinois. After baseball he opened "Ray Starr's Home Plate", a local eatery. He died in 1963, aged 56, of an apparent heart attack in Baylis, Illinois.

References

External links

1906 births
1963 deaths
Major League Baseball pitchers
National League All-Stars
St. Louis Cardinals players
New York Giants (NL) players
Boston Braves players
Cincinnati Reds players
Pittsburgh Pirates players
Chicago Cubs players
Baseball players from Oklahoma
People from Nowata, Oklahoma
Nashville Vols players